Stackebrandtia is a Gram-positive, aerobic and non-motile genus of bacteria from the family of Glycomycetaceae. Stackebrandtia is named after the German microbiologist Erko Stackebrandt.

References

Further reading 
 

Bacteria genera
Actinomycetia
Taxa described in 2002